The Blake  executive council was the 14th executive council of British Ceylon. The government was led by Governor Henry Arthur Blake.

Executive council members

See also
 Cabinet of Sri Lanka

References

1903 establishments in Ceylon
1907 disestablishments in Ceylon
Cabinets established in 1903
Cabinets disestablished in 1907
Ceylonese executive councils
Ministries of Edward VII